A gabion (from Italian gabbione meaning "big cage"; from Italian gabbia and Latin cavea meaning "cage") is a cage, cylinder or box filled with rocks, concrete, or sometimes sand and soil for use in civil engineering, road building, military applications and landscaping.

For erosion control, caged riprap is used. For dams or in foundation construction, cylindrical metal structures are used. In a military context, earth- or sand-filled gabions are used to protect sappers, infantry, and artillerymen from enemy fire.

Leonardo da Vinci designed a type of gabion called a Corbeille Leonard ("Leonard[o] basket") for the foundations of the San Marco Castle in Milan.

Civil engineering

The most common civil engineering use of gabions was refined and patented by Gaetano Maccaferri in the late 19th century in Sacerno, Emilia Romagna and used to stabilize shorelines, stream banks or slopes against erosion. Other uses include retaining walls, noise barriers, temporary flood walls, silt filtration from runoff, for small or temporary/permanent dams, river training, or channel lining. They may be used to direct the force of a flow of flood water around a vulnerable structure.

Gabions are also used as fish screens on small streams. Gabion stepped weirs are commonly used for river training and flood control; the stepped design enhances the rate of energy dissipation in the channel, and it is particularly well suited to the construction of gabion stepped weirs.

A gabion wall is a retaining wall made of stacked stone-filled gabions tied together with wire. Gabion walls are usually battered (angled back towards the slope), or stepped back with the slope, rather than stacked vertically.

The life expectancy of gabions depends on the lifespan of the wire, not on the contents of the basket. The structure will fail when the wire fails. Galvanized steel wire is most common, but PVC-coated and stainless steel wire are also used. PVC-coated galvanized gabions have been estimated to survive for 60 years. Some gabion manufacturers guarantee a structural consistency of 50 years.

In the United States, gabion use within streams first began with projects completed from 1957 to 1965 on North River, Virginia, and Zealand River, New Hampshire. More than 150 grade-control structures, bank revetments and channel deflectors were constructed on the two U.S. Forest Service sites. Eventually, a large portion of the in-stream structures failed due to undermining and lack of structural integrity of the baskets. In particular, corrosion and abrasion of wires by bedload movement compromised the structures, which then sagged and collapsed into the channels. Other gabions were toppled into channels as trees grew and enlarged on top of gabion revetments, leveraging them toward the river channels.

Gabions have also been used in building, as in the Dominus Winery in the Napa Valley, California, by architects Herzog & de Meuron, constructed between 1995 and 1997. The exterior is formed by modular wire mesh gabions containing locally quarried stone; this construction allows air movement through the building and creates an environment of moderate temperatures inside.

Variations in design

There are various special designs of gabions to meet particular functional requirements and some special terms for particular forms have come into use. For example:
 Bastion: a gabion lined internally with a membrane, typically of nonwoven geotextile to permit the use of granular soil fill, instead of rock.
 Mattress: a form of gabion short in height relative to the lateral dimensions; commonly very wide. For protecting surfaces from wave erosion and similar attack, rather than building or supporting high structures.
 Trapion: a form of gabion with a trapezoidal cross-section, designed for stacking to give a face that is sloping rather than stepped. The term is in wide usage, but in contexts related to gabions at least, appears to be a trademark registered by Betafence Limited.

Military use

Early gabions were round cages with open tops and bottoms, made from wickerwork and filled with earth for use as military fortifications. These early military gabions were most often used to protect sappers and siege artillery gunners. The wickerwork cylinders were light and could be carried relatively conveniently in the ammunition train, particularly if they were made in several diameters to fit one inside another. At the site of use in the field, they could be stood on end, staked in position, and filled with soil to form an effective wall around the gun, or rapidly construct a bulletproof parapet along a sap.  During the Crimean War, local shortages of brushwood led to use of scrap hoop-iron from hay bales in its stead; this in turn led to purpose-built sheet-iron gabions.

Today, gabions are often used to protect forward operating bases (FOBs) against explosive, fragmentary, indirect fires such as mortar or artillery fire. Examples of areas within a FOB that make extensive use of gabions are sleeping quarters, mess halls, or any place where there would be a large concentration of unprotected soldiers. Gabions are also used for aircraft revetments, blast walls, and similar structures. A gabion is often referred to as a "Hesco bastion".

Impact attenuation 
Gabions may be used for attenuating dynamic load as those resulting from impacts by vehicles or rockfall for example. First, gabions may be suitable as a vehicle restraint system in scenic lower speed roads. Second,  when used as facing of earth-reinforced structures with a vertical face, gabions offer a more deformable surface to impact compared to other classical geotechnical alternatives. This higher deformability results from crushing and large displacements of the fill content. As a result, the impact load transmitted to the structure is reduced, due to both impact energy dissipation and peak force attenuation. In an optimization process, the fill material can be adapted to meet specific requirements, in terms of impact response. This in particular led to the use of recycled materials (tires and ballast from railway tracks) in the core of some rockfall protection embankments.

See also

 , a small-scale mattress gabion used for roads, retaining walls, and protective structures.
 , a modernized version of the same concept
 , wire mesh gabions introduced into modern civil engineering

References

 Freeman, Gary E.; Fischenich, Craig J.(May 2000), "Gabions for Streambank Erosion Control", Environmental Laboratory, U.S. Army Corps of Engineers.
 University of New South Wales Water Research Laboratory, Research Report No. 156, "Some factors affecting the use of Maccaferri gabions and reno mattresses for coastal revetments", October 1979, C. T. Brown, et al.

 
Warfare of the Middle Ages
Architectural elements
Water conservation
Desert greening